A number of different automobiles were marketed under the Austin A40 name by Austin between 1947 and 1967.

Austin's naming scheme at that time derived from the approximate engine output, in horsepower.  Therefore, the models were also given names, originally based on counties of England.

The following vehicles were sold under the Austin A40 name:
 1947–50 Austin A40 Dorset 2-door saloon
 1947–52 Austin A40 Devon 4-door saloon
 1947–56 Austin A40 Countryman 2-door estate car
 1947–56 Austin A40 Van 2-door panel van
 1947–56 Austin A40 Pick-up 2-door pick-up truck
 1948–5? Austin A40 Tourer 2-door, four passenger tourer built in Australia
 19??–19?? Austin A40 Coupe Utility 2-door coupe utility, produced in Australia
 1950–53 Austin A40 Sports 2-door, four passenger convertible with twin-carburettors and aluminium bodyshell
 1952–54 Austin A40 Somerset 4-door saloon and 2-door convertible
 1954–56 Austin A40 Cambridge 4-door saloon
 1958–67 Austin A40 Farina 2-door saloon and 2-door hatchback

References

Austin Memories

A40